KGLO (1300 AM) is a radio station licensed to serve Mason City, Iowa.  The station is owned by Alpha Media, through licensee Digity 3E License, LLC.  It airs a news/talk radio format.  The station aired an adult contemporary format during the 1980s.

The station's call letters reflect the Globe Gazette newspaper.  The station began broadcasting in 1938 on the assigned frequency of 1210 kHz. It was owned by Lee Broadcasting, a subsidiary of the owner of the Globe Gazette, Lee Enterprises.   The founding general manager of KGLO and Lee Broadcasting was Francis C. Eighmey. KGLO began operation with only 250 watts of power.  It was the lowest wattage radio station to be included in the CBS Radio Network, but the station served what was recognized as a key market area in the midwest.

In the early 1940s, the station was moved to its present frequency of 1300 in order to increase transmitting power. On March 29, 1941, its power was increased to 1,000 watts day and night with a non-directional antenna.  The transmitting location was on old Highway 18 just west of Mason City.  Shortly thereafter, power was increased to five kilowatts and two flanking towers were added to produce a directional signal at night with deep nulls to the east and west. In 1998, the transmitter was moved to six miles south of Mason City with directional pattern both day and night to provide a better signal over Mason City.

The revenue generated by KGLO radio provided for significant corporate expansion.  Eighmey began this process with the acquisition of WTAD in Quincy, Illinois. Additional radio stations were later added in Wisconsin. Lee Broadcasting also established KGLO-TV, the area's CBS affiliate, in 1954; that station is now KIMT-TV.  Other television stations were acquired, including KGMB-TV in Honolulu and KOIN-TV in Portland. In the 1960s, the Lee Newspapers were merged with Lee Broadcasting.

The KGLO call letters were assigned to the station by the Federal Communications Commission.

References

External links
KGLO official website
KGLO's news website

GLO
News and talk radio stations in the United States
Mason City, Iowa
Alpha Media radio stations
Radio stations established in 1938
1938 establishments in Iowa